Epiricania is a genus of moths in the family Epipyropidae described by Kato in 1939.

Species
Epiricania hagoromo Kato, 1939
Epiricania melanoleuca (T. B. Fletcher, 1939)

References

Epipyropidae
Zygaenoidea genera